The Veli Pasha Mosque (from ), also known as the Mastaba Mosque from its location and currently houses the Paleontological Museum of Rethymno, is a historical Ottoman-era mosque in the town of Rethymno, Crete, in south Greece. Originally built in the mid of the seventeenth century shortly after the fall of Rethymno to the Ottomans, it now functions as a museum of the pre-history of the island of Crete.

History 
Veli Pasha Mosque was built outside the walls by a supporter of Gazi Hüseyin Pasha on the site of an older Christian church dedicated to Saint Onuphrius. It is associated with the conquest of Rethymno by the Ottomans in 1646; on the site that the Ottoman troops made their military camp, the Muslim community of the town would later erect the mosque of Veli Pasha, perhaps around 1651. The oldest attestation of the mosque goes back to 1657, in the account of the local governor of Rethymno.

It was heavily damaged by bombing in World War II. The monument was later restored in the early 2010s and now houses the Paleontological Museum of Rethymno. It was granted to the Goulandris Natural History Museum by decision of the Greek Ministry of Culture and Sports, and opened to the public in 2008.

Architecture 
Veli Pasha Mosque has a roof with six small domes and a portico surmounted by three larger domes, amounting to nine domes in total. Its old complex also included thirteen cells, a tekke, an institution for the gathering of dervishes, who in those years followed the armies and played an important role in the socialization of urban and rural Muslims.

Its tall and wholly surviving minaret is dated a little later than the mosque itself; according to an inscription found on it, it was constructed in 1789, making it Rethymno's oldest surviving minaret. The inscription also bears the words "God bless it! Glory and gratitude to the Lord... We made a donation and renovated the minaret so that the adhan can be heard and for God's mercy".

See also 

 Islam in Greece
 List of former mosques in Greece
 List of mosques in Greece
 Ottoman Greece

References

Bibliography

External links 
 

Former mosques in Greece
Ottoman mosques in Greece
17th-century architecture in Greece
17th-century mosques
Ottoman architecture in Crete
Religious buildings and structures in Crete
Rethymno
Mosque buildings with domes
Museums in Crete